Blue River is a small community in British Columbia, situated on  British Columbia Highway 5 about halfway between Kamloops and Jasper, Alberta, located at the confluence of the Blue and North Thompson Rivers. The local economy is supported by logging, tourism and transportation industries.

Geography
Blue River lies in a wide, gravelly part of the North Thompson River valley. Its podzolic soils are strongly acidic and coarse, with abundant sand, gravel and stones. Drainage is not as rapid as would be expected from the soils' coarse texture because the subsoils tend to be cemented.

The forests and mountains around Blue River have plentiful big game such as deer, moose, black bear, grizzly bear, and caribou. Birds include osprey, eagle, woodpecker and raven. The mountain pine beetle has become the area's most significant insect.

Lodgepole pine is the most common tree at Blue River, although its population has been severely reduced by the mountain pine beetle. Other common native conifers are Douglas-fir, Engelmann spruce, subalpine fir, western hemlock and western red cedar. Among deciduous trees, the black cottonwood is largest; trembling aspen and paper birch are also prominent. Non-native trees which may be seen in Blue River include green ash, littleleaf linden, silver maple, and Norway maple. Sugar maple, burr oak, northern red oak and butternut formerly thrived at the CNR Gardens.

Climate
Blue River has a continental climate which is subject to frequent modification by maritime air masses from the Pacific Ocean. The area is part of the world's only interior temperate rainforest that occupies parts of eastern British Columbia. Heavy and deep snow falls most winters. The most severe cold spells may send thermometer readings below -40 °C/F. Rain is frequent in other seasons. Summer days are warm or occasionally hot, with thunderstorms often spawning over the nearby mountains.

See also
Blue River railway station
Mud Lake Delta Provincial Park

References

External links
Blue River & Avola Tourist Information Website

Designated places in British Columbia
Unincorporated settlements in British Columbia
Thompson Country
Populated places in the Thompson-Nicola Regional District